Cojușna is a village in Strășeni District, Moldova.

Notable people

References

Villages of Strășeni District